My Life Me (French: Trois et moi) is a short-running animated television series created by JC Little, Cindy Filipenko and Svetlana Chmakova, co-directed by Mr. Niko. The teen slice-of-life comedy follows Birch Small, a manga and anime fan with aspirations of being a comic artist, as she tries to survive junior high school. The show features manga symbols such as sweatdrops, speech bubbles, and super-deformed chibi characters.

The series first aired on the French-language Télétoon on September 19, 2010. It was shown on the English-language channel Teletoon from September 5, 2011 to September 30, 2011. It received generally negative reviews for its art-style, writing, humor and weak characterizations, and was cancelled after its first and only season.

The series is available on Peacock and The Roku Channel.

Production
My Life Me received a development deal in 2006 from Teletoon. The series was a co-production between Canadian and French companies. The episodes were animated using ToonBoom Harmony, and the animation was split episodically between Toutenkartoon in Montreal, Quebec, Canada, and Caribara in Angoulême, France. Backgrounds were created in Maya, then cel-shaded, rendered and imported into Harmony. The animators did a hybrid of digital and hand drawn to help the fluidity in the animation.

Animated digitally, manga aesthetics were given homage "using various comic book manga codes and language such as stylish black and white comic book panels dropping behind the characters to express their suppressed feelings on screen." Even before production began My Life Me was planned to be "developed as a lifestyle brand, there will be a licensing and merchandising program to support the brand with a strong emphasis on publishing, accessories, gifts, stationery, apparel as well as a strong online component with a fully interactive website currently in production." The planned delivery of the series, shorts, and website was fall 2009.

My Life Me was "at the top of German co-production group TV-Loonland AG's offering in the 2009 autumn TV markets". In early 2010, TV-Loonland filed for bankruptcy/insolvency and its assets were sold off. My Life Me, at the time still in production, was one of such properties. The series was acquired by Classic Media in February. Classic Media took control of all media iterations of the property including the planned "heavily interactive" website. "Other than the television series, fifty-two eleven-minute episodes, the property is reported to include music video clips and more for mobile, online, and video on-demand distribution."

Premise
Birch Small's school system requires her and her classmates, Liam, Sandra, and Raffi to work together in a group known around the school as a "Pod." The students don't get to choose who they are partnered up with; they must work together, despite their differences and shortcomings.

Characters
 Birch Small (Voiced by Claudia-Laurie Corbeil in the French version, and Sara Camacho in the English version): A young talented artist and manga fan. Birch is 13 years old. Birch has a crush on Raffi as hinted in a number of episodes, and is shown to be very familiar with almost anything involving art, including various historical artist names. Although Raffi only considers Birch as a friend, and never sees her as a love interest, Birch's crush on him and her constantly trying to impress him has her often doing absurd things, such as becoming vegetarian simply because Raffi was conflicted with her love of fast foods and meaty foods. She is also heavily interested with Japanese manga and is usually seen drawing these comics in said style.
 Liam Coll (Voiced by Nicolas Charbonneaux-Collombet in the French version, and Mark Hauser in the English version): 13-year-old cousin of Birch. Very little is known about Liam other than he's very close to Birch as he's often seen in Birch's house for one reason or another, usually looking for a good time. His goofy personality often causes problems, even getting himself into a "duel" with another kid in school unintentionally; however, his personal skills and specialties have their uses and can come out to help and often come out to help his "pod" in tight situations. He loves music, is easily jealous of Raffi over his popularity. Liam also expresses a rather continuous problem of being unable to "find himself" as that he can't find one thing he wants to be or one thing to fully define himself as he will often express a different hobby or interest in different episode. It's expressed that he's been doing this since grade 6. Like Birch, Liam is heavily into manga, and contributes the plot and writing to Birch's illustrations.
 Sandra le Blanc (Voiced by Émilie Bibeau in the French version, and Stéfanie Buxton in the English version): A 13-year-old skateboarding fan and highly athletic girl who likes to take things to the extreme, such as getting volunteers to do a skateboard jump over. She has a rather devious and somewhat sadistic personality, as she often will do things to earn the discomfort and embarrassment of others for her own entertainment, and often would go so far as to try to get others including members of her "pod" to get angry at each other again for her own entertainment. She constantly denies of her "geek phase" that she had before, instead constantly bashing her own pod's geeky moments.
 Raffi Rodriguez (Voiced by Émile Mailhiot in the French version, and Justin Bradley in the English version): Love interest of Birch. Often considered the coolest guy in school, he often gets chosen for events and fund-raisers, much to the jealousy of other males such as Liam. He is 13 years old and, often concerned about his looks and often expresses that as his only concern at times. He's shown to care for Birch considerably, although he does not show any romantic feelings for her whatsoever. One of the ways the official website has described him as, "would drive anyone crazy if he wasn't so darn nice".

Episodes
Teletoon original airdates follow the episode titles in parentheses:

Misconcepted Deceptions
Reach for the Pod
Big Man on Canvas
The Pencil Assassin
The Makeover
The Pom-Pom Girl
Unreasonable Facsimiles
Planets Maligned
The Big Flap
Finding Neko
The Raffi Raffle
Crushed
Friday the 13th
Bossman's Blues
Birch's Beef
A Fine Balance
Liam the Hero
True Colors
Love Lessons
Miss President
Bad Company
Manga Slam
They're Watching Us
The Mascot
Holiday Hijinx
Rope Burn
There's No Business...
Growing Pains
Comic Chaos
Working Stiff
Star-Struck
The Big Switch
A Bed for Raffi
Back to the Stone Age
The Costume Party
Integrity Insmegrity
Making a Mountain of a Molehill
Here's Liam
The Diary
Raffi's Secret Love
Skate Club
Pinged and Ponged
Love is in the Air
Cyranette
Liam and the Kid's Big Day Out
Cut Out the Sarkasm
Family Tree
Just Say Nooo
At Odds with the Pad
Accept No Substitutes
Fish Fiasco
Birch's Trial

Nominations
It was nominated for a Kidscreen Award 2010. The MyLifeME.com website was nominated for Best Kids Interactive for the Canada New Media Awards in 2010. My Life Me was nominated for two Gemini Awards in 2011; in Internet and New Media, Best Website for a Program or Series: Youth and in Television, Best Animation Program or Series.

References

External links
 

2010s Canadian animated television series
2010s Canadian high school television series
2011 Canadian television series debuts
2011 Canadian television series endings
Canadian children's animated comedy television series
2010s French animated television series
2011 French television series debuts
2011 French television series endings
French children's animated comedy television series
Anime-influenced Western animated television series
Teletoon original programming
English-language television shows
French-language television shows
Teen animated television series